Alyssum artvinense, the Artvinian alyssum, is a species in the family Brassicaceae that is endemic to only five locations in Erzurum Province and Artvin Province in northeastern Turkey. It can be found on igneous rocky and stony slopes, in forest clearings, from elevations of 320–1,850 m. It is threatened by habitat loss and habitat degradation from dams, roads and erosion.

References

artvinense
Endangered plants
Endemic flora of Turkey
Plants described in 1909